Theresa Cornwallis West (née Whitby; 1806–1886) (Mrs F. West) was a British author. She is most noted for her A Summer Visit to Ireland in 1846 and wrote stories for children, young adults and even a novel for adults (The Doom of Doolandour).  Her travelogue, written as a member of the English upper class visiting Ireland as a tourist, in the early stages of the Famine has proven a valuable source of both information and views.  She was born at Newlands Manor, Hampshire to the Royal Navy Captain John Whitby (flag captain for Admiral Sir William Cornwallis) and Mary Anne Theresa Whitby (1783–1850) (née Symonds, the writer, landowner, artist and reintroducer of sericulture to England). Theresa married, in 1827, Frederick Richard West (1799–1862) of Ruthin Castle and unlike his first wife bore children and went on to outlive him.<ref>Williams, William H. A., 2011, Creating Irish Tourism: The First Century, 1750–1850, Anthem Press</ref>

Selected works
 West, Theresa Cornwallis Whitby., 1847. A summer visit to Ireland in 1846. London: R. Bentley.
 West, Theresa Cornwallis, 1884. The Doom of Doolandour. A Chronicle of Two Races. London: Wyman & Sons
 West, Theresa Cornwallis J., 1876. All for an Ideal: a Girl's dream of a past period.
 West, Theresa Cornwallis J., 1883. God's Arithmetic: with other stories for the young. London: Partridge & Co.
 West, Theresa Cornwallis J., 1855. Frescoes and Sketches from Memory. J. Mitchell, London
 West, Theresa Cornwallis J., 1903. For the Sake of a Crown: a tale of the Netherlands''. Religious Tract Society: London.

References

1806 births
1886 deaths
19th-century English women writers